Joas Magolego (13 October 1971 – 4 July 2014), popularly known as Hluphi, was a South African football defender who played for Mamelodi Sundowns from 1990 until 2002, and won two caps with the national team in 1993.

References

1971 births
2014 deaths
Association football defenders
South African soccer players
South Africa international soccer players
Mamelodi Sundowns F.C. players